"Hey Love" may refer to:

Songs
 "Hey Love" (Stevie Wonder song), a 1966 soul song by Stevie Wonder
 "Hey Love", a song by The Delfonics from the 1972 album Tell Me This Is a Dream
 "Hey Love (Can I Have a Word)", a 1992 song by R. Kelly and Public Announcement featuring Mr. Lee
 "Hey Love" (Quadron song), a 2013 song by the Danish duo Quadron

Albums
 Hey, Love, a 1971 album by New Rotary Connection
 Hey Love (Hayden album), a 2015 album by the Canadian singer-songwriter Hayden

See also
 "Talkin' Bout Hey Love", a song by De La Soul from the 1991 album De La Soul Is Dead